Maryland elected its members October 6, 1816.

See also 
 1816 Maryland's 3rd congressional district special election
 1816 Maryland's 5th congressional district special elections
 1816 and 1817 United States House of Representatives elections
 List of United States representatives from Maryland

Notes

References 

1816
Maryland
United States House of Representatives